Staunton Lake Water Aerodrome  is a registered aererdome located on Staunton Lake, Ontario, Canada.

References

Registered aerodromes in Kenora District
Seaplane bases in Ontario